Budhasvamin (बुधस्वामिन, also transliterated as Budhasvāmin and  Budha·svamin), was a Sanskrit poet, known as the author of the , or The Compilation of Verses from the Long Story. Nothing is known of his life.

Budhasvamin was a masterful poet. His Sanskrit is polished and easy to understand; although he occasionally shows off his virtuosity by using obscure words and archaic verb forms, he never lets his mastery get in the way of the story. He deliberately eschews elaborate description in favour of a fast-paced narrative and deft characterization. He displays a keen interest in all aspects of ancient Indian society: despite the poem being the story of a divine prince, the stories within the narrative have a wide range of protagonists, from artisans and seafaring traders to courtesans and forest-dwellers.

About the 

Budhasvamin’s : A Literary Study of an Ancient Indian Narrative by E.P. Maten, Leiden, Netherlands: E. J. Brill, 1973.

English translations

External links
Clay Sanskrit Library (official page)

Sanskrit poets